Molinia caerulea, known by the common name purple moor-grass, is a species of grass that is native to Europe, west Asia, and north Africa. Like most grasses, it grows best in acid soils, ideally pH values of between 3.5 and 5, however, it can continue to live under more extreme conditions, sometimes to as low as 2. It is common on moist heathland, bogs and moorland throughout Britain and Ireland. Introduced populations exist in northeastern and northwestern North America.

The specific epithet caerulea means "deep blue" and refers to the purple spikelets.

Description
The leaves are coarse, green, taper to a point, long, flat and sometimes slightly hairy on top. Due to the dense tussock it is very resistant to heath fires. Its ligule is a ring of hairs, as in heath grass (Danthonia decumbens).

It flowers between July and September, later than any other species.

Ecology
The caterpillars of some Lepidoptera use it as a foodplant, e.g., the chequered skipper (Carterocephalus palaemon).

Claviceps purpurea is an ascomycetous fungus which grows on the seeds of purple moor grass.

Purple moor grass and rush pastures is a United Kingdom Biodiversity Action Plan habitat, on account of its rarity.

Cultivation
Molinia caerulea is cultivated for its panicles of purple spikelets on yellow stems. Numerous cultivars have been selected, of which the following have gained the Royal Horticultural Society's Award of Garden Merit: 
M. caerulea subsp. arundinacea 'Windspiel' 
M. caerulea subsp. caerulea 'Edith Dudszus' 
M. caerulea subsp. caerulea 'Moorhexe' 
M. caerulea subsp. caerulea 'Poul Petersen' 
M. caerulea subsp. caerulea 'Variegata'

Gallery

References

External links

Molinieae
Bunchgrasses of Europe
Bunchgrasses of Africa
Bunchgrasses of Asia
Flora of North Africa
Flora of Western Asia
Garden plants of Europe
Garden plants of Asia
Garden plants of Africa
Plants described in 1753
Taxa named by Carl Linnaeus